John Holloway may refer to:

John Holloway (Virginia politician) (1666–1734), mayor of Williamsburg, Virginia, 1722–1723
John Holloway (Royal Navy officer) (1744–1826), British colonial official and governor of Newfoundland, 1807–1809
John Chandler Holloway (1826–1901), member of the Wisconsin State Assembly and the Wisconsin State Senate
John Holloway (athlete) (1878–1950), British Olympic decathlete
John Holloway (botanist) (1881–1945), New Zealand Anglican priest, botanist and university lecturer
John Thorpe Holloway (1914–1977), New Zealand alpine explorer and forest ecologist
John Holloway (poet) (1920–1999), British academic and poet
John Holloway (diplomat) (1943–2013), Australian diplomat
John Holloway (sociologist) (born 1947), Marxist writer
John Holloway (musician) (born 1948), British baroque violinist

See also
Jonathan Holloway (disambiguation), multiple people